The Lego Movie is an American media franchise based on Lego construction toys. It began with the 2014 film The Lego Movie, which was directed and written by Phil Lord and Christopher Miller. The success of the film led to the release of two licensed video games, a 4D film theme park attraction, two spin-off films titled The Lego Batman Movie and The Lego Ninjago Movie, which were released in 2017, Unikitty! an animated television series that also came out in the same year, and the sequel to the original film titled The Lego Movie 2: The Second Part in 2019. Plans for a third spin-off film and a sequel to The Lego Batman Movie were later shelved. The franchise has received a generally positive critical reception, with the exception of The Lego Ninjago Movie which received mixed reviews, and has grossed $1 billion at the worldwide box office. While Warner Bros. still owned the rights to their run of the franchise from 2014 to 2020, including the Unikitty! animated television series, Universal Pictures bought the rights to make plans for an upcoming Lego Movie (after a termination of Warner Bros.' film rights with Lego at the end of 2019) as part of a 5-year deal.

Films

Note: All four films in the franchise were produced as a collaboration between Warner Animation Group, Vertigo Entertainment, Rideback (formerly Lin Pictures), and The Lego Group, with animation provided by Animal Logic. However, RatPac-Dune Entertainment (now called Access Entertainment) only had involvement with the first three films (and not The Second Part). Village Roadshow Pictures only had involvement financing the first Lego Movie, and not the rest. Lord Miller Productions did not have involvement with the first, even though Phil Lord and Chris Miller directed the film, as well as providing the screenplay, but did produce the remaining three Lego movies for Warner Bros. Only two movies were released in IMAX Theaters; these include The Lego Batman Movie and The Lego Movie 2: The Second Part. The Lego Ninjago Movie was originally planned for an IMAX release, but was cancelled and only received non-IMAX presentations and then eventually, Kingsman: The Golden Circle took over the IMAX screenings.

The Lego Movie (2014)

The film was released theatrically on February 7, 2014, through Warner Bros. Pictures and Village Roadshow Pictures to near-unanimous acclaim; critics praised its visual style, humor, voice cast and heartwarming message. It earned more than $257 million in the U.S. and Canada and $210 million in other territories, for a worldwide total of over $469 million. The film won the BAFTA Award for Best Animated Film, the Critics' Choice Movie Award for Best Animated Feature, and the Saturn Award for Best Animated Film. It was also nominated for the Golden Globe Award for Best Animated Feature Film. The film also received an Academy Award nomination for Best Original Song for "Everything Is Awesome".

The Lego Batman Movie (2017)

In October 2014, Warner Bros. scheduled the release of The Lego Batman Movie, a spin-off starring Batman, for 2017, moving the release date for The Lego Movie 2 (later titled as The Lego Movie 2: The Second Part) to 2018. Will Arnett returned to voice Batman, with Chris McKay, who was earlier attached to the sequel, directing the film, the story written by Seth Grahame-Smith, and the film produced by Dan Lin, Roy Lee, Phil Lord and Christopher Miller. On April 20, 2015, Warner Bros. scheduled The Lego Batman Movie for a February 10, 2017 release. In July 2015, Arnett's Arrested Development co-star Michael Cera was cast to voice Robin. In August 2015, Zach Galifianakis entered final negotiations to voice the Joker. In October 2015, Rosario Dawson was cast to voice Barbara Gordon, the daughter of police commissioner James Gordon who later becomes the crime-fighting heroine Batgirl. The following month, Ralph Fiennes was cast as Alfred Pennyworth, Bruce Wayne's butler. Mariah Carey, although initial reports indicated she was playing Commissioner Gordon, was actually cast as Mayor McCaskill. The score was composed by Lorne Balfe. The first trailer for the film was released on March 24, 2016, followed by a second on March 28 the same year. The film was released in the United States on February 10, 2017.

The Lego Ninjago Movie (2017)

Brothers Dan and Kevin Hageman, who wrote Ninjago: Masters of Spinjitzu and co-wrote the story of The Lego Movie, co-wrote the film adaptation of Lego Ninjago, which features a new take that diverges from the TV series. Charlie Bean, who produced Disney's Tron: Uprising, directed the film, produced by The Lego Movie team of Dan Lin, Roy Lee, Phil Lord and Christopher Miller.[31] The spin-off movie was scheduled to be released on September 23, 2016.[32] On April 20, 2015, the film was delayed until September 22, 2017, as Storks took over the original release date of the movie.[12] In June 2016, the cast was announced to include Jackie Chan, Dave Franco, Michael Peña, Abbi Jacobson, Kumail Nanjiani, Zach Woods and Fred Armisen respectively. It is the second and last spin-off film of The Lego Movie franchise to be distributed by Warner Bros. Pictures.

The Lego Movie 2: The Second Part (2019)

Before the critical acclaim and blockbuster success of The Lego Movie, talks for a sequel were already in motion. On February 3, 2014, Jared Stern and Michelle Morgan were tasked to write a screenplay. On February 21, 2014, the studio scheduled the sequel for a May 26, 2017, release. On March 12, 2014, Deadline reported that the first film's animation co-director Chris McKay would direct the sequel with Phil Lord and Christopher Miller as producers. Warner Bros. did not invite co-producer of the first film, Village Roadshow Pictures, to return as a participant in the sequel, due to Warner Bros. having now more confidence in the film and trying to keep as much profit as possible for itself. On April 10, 2014, McKay expressed that he would like to introduce more women in the sequel than men. On July 28, 2014, it was reported that on the internet, Chris Pratt expressed interest in reprising his role as Emmet for the sequel. It was also reported that Will Arnett might return as Batman, but had not decided yet.

In October 2014, Warner Bros. scheduled The Lego Batman Movie for 2017, and The Lego Movie 2 for 2018. By October 25, 2014, Lord and Miller had signed on to write The Lego Movie 2. The writers implied that the sequel would take place four years after the events of The Lego Movie. In February 2015, Warner Bros. announced that the title of the sequel had been changed to The Lego Movie Sequel, and that Rob Schrab, co-writer of Monster House replaced McKay as director since McKay went to direct The Lego Batman Movie. According to an interview at the Santa Barbara International Film Festival, the sequel would focus on Emmet and his sister, taking place in a "weird, dystopian version of Bricksburg." On April 20, 2015, Warner Bros. scheduled The Lego Movie Sequel for a May 18, 2018 release date. On June 17, 2016, the film's release was delayed until February 8, 2019. By July 2016, Raphael Bob-Waksberg had been hired to do rewrites of the script. By February 2017, Schrab had been replaced by Mike Mitchell, reportedly due to "creative differences". On September 6, 2017, it was announced that production of The Lego Movie Sequel would begin in Canada on October 2, 2017. It was also announced that Lord and Miller returned to re-rewrite the script to tackle gender issues on how a girl plays versus how a boy plays.

On March 23, 2018, it was confirmed that Tiffany Haddish was cast in the film as a new lead character while returning actors would be Pratt as Master Builder Emmet Brickowski, and addition to reprise the role of Emmet, Pratt would also voice the antagonist, Rex Dangervest. Elizabeth Banks reprises her role as Wyldstyle, and Arnett returns to reprise Batman, Channing Tatum as Superman & Jonah Hill as Green Lantern.
On May 21, 2018, Warner Bros. officially renamed the film The Lego Movie 2: The Second Part along with releasing the first teaser poster. It is the last film of The Lego Movie franchise to be distributed by Warner Bros. Pictures, as Universal Pictures subsequently became the distributor of the franchise's future films through 2024.

Cancelled films

The Billion Brick Race 
In March 2015, Warner Bros. announced that a third Lego Movie spin-off, titled The Billion Brick Race, was in development. By July 2016, Jason Segel and Drew Pearce signed onto the project as co-directors and co-writers. In August 2017, it was announced that Jorge R. Gutierrez was hired to replace them as its sole writer and director. At that time, the film was scheduled to be released on May 24, 2019 (The day Aladdin was released).

By February 2018, Gutierrez had left the project. In July 2018, the film's plot was announced by Pearce to be a Lego racing movie, inspired by pre-existing racing films, including The Cannonball Run.

In December 2019, concept art of the film's main characters was revealed by the film's initial director Jorge R. Gutierrez, along with the confirmation that the project had been cancelled. The poor box office results of the previous two Lego films along with the film's lengthy conceptual phase were given as the primary reasons.

In July 2022, Gutierrez stated on Twitter that he intended for the film's two leads to be voiced by Diego Luna and Emma Stone. The film was also going to include elements of time travel as well as an appearance by the creator of Lego, Ole Kirk Kristiansen.

Lego Superfriends 
In December 2018, Chris McKay confirmed that a sequel was in development for 2022 release and that he would return to direct the film. However, the sequel was cancelled due to Warner Bros. losing the Lego film rights with Universal signing a deal as the distributors for future Lego films, because DC Comics is owned by Warner Bros.

In June 2021, McKay revealed that the script was being written by Michael Waldron and Dan Harmon, and was stated to have taken notes from The Godfather Part II as well as Boogie Nights. The film would have focused on Batman's relationship with the Justice League, particularly Superman, and the main antagonists would have been Lex Luthor and OMAC. The film was tentatively titled Lego Superfriends.

Future

Universal Pictures era 
In December 2019, Universal Pictures entered early negotiations to distribute upcoming feature film properties based on the Lego toys. Although Universal Pictures will develop and distribute future Lego films, the original Lego Movie characters and films are still owned by Warner Bros. In April 2020, the deal with Universal was set for a limited 5-year film deal with Warner Bros. still owning the previous films.

The Lego Movie 3 
On August 8, 2022, Dan Lin revealed that a third film of the series titled The Lego Movie 3 is in development. Lin promises that the creative team has "reinvented" the LEGO world for the third film, but it does not yet have a release date.

Television

Unikitty! (2017-2020)

In May 2017, Warner Bros. and Lego announced that Unikitty, a character from The Lego Movie, would get a spin-off television series on Cartoon Network. For the show, she is voiced by Tara Strong. The premiere date was January 1, 2018 and the show's executive producers are Phil Lord, Christopher Miller, Dan Lin, Roy Lee, Jill Wilfert and Sam Register. Ed Skudder (creator of Dick Figures) and Lynn Wang (character designer on Star vs. the Forces of Evil) are signed as producers while Aaron Horvath serves as supervising producer. The series aired a Halloween special/sneak peek titled "Spoooooky Game" on October 27, 2017. The series aired a second sneak peek "Sparkle Matter Matters" on November 17, 2017, and a third and final sneak peek/Christmas special titled "No Day Like Snow Day" aired December 1, 2017. On August 27, 2020, the series concluded with a two-part finale titled "The Birthday To End All Birthdays".

Short films
Short films set within the franchise were produced. Most of which were released on the home media releases of the films. In addition, various other shorts made to promote the films and unrelated real world events have been released on YouTube.

Batman's A True Artist (2014)
Batman's A True Artist is a stop-motion animated short film included on the home media release of The Lego Movie, it is presented as music video to Batman's song from that film. It was created by then-6-year-old Markus Jolly.

Michelangelo and Lincoln: History Cops (2014)
Michelangelo and Lincoln: History Cops is a stop-motion animated short film included on the home media release of The Lego Movie. It is presented as a trailer to a fictional action blockbuster starring the master builders, Michelangelo and Abraham Lincoln as they fight crime.

Enter the Ninjago (2014)
Enter the Ninjago is a short film included on the home media release of The Lego Movie. The president of Hollywood sits down with Emmet and changes up the plot of The Lego Movie to prominently feature ninjas for marketing purposes. They eventually decide to create a new ninja based film, titled "The super-crunchy ninja skateboard party movie with pratfalls slash physical comedy and cute furry animals for the international audience" which the short jokingly states became the biggest box-office bomb in the history of cinema. The whole film is reference to Lego Ninjago.

The Master (2016)
The Master is a 2016 computer animated short film written and directed by Jon Saunders, co-written by Ross Evans, Carey Yost and Remington D. Donovan and produced by Ryan Halprin. The short film was released on September 23, 2016, with Warner Animation Group's Storks, as well as early showings of The Lego Batman Movie in the United Kingdom. It stars Jackie Chan as Master Wu, Abbi Jacobson as The Chicken, and Justin Theroux as Narrator. The short follows Wu and an annoying chicken. This is the first Lego short film to be released in theaters, and is also the first theatrical short film from The Lego Movie franchise.

Dark Hoser (2017)
Dark Hoser is a short film included on the home media release of The Lego Batman Movie. Batman attends a tryout to apply to be a member of the Justice League of America, but only finds out he might be Canadian.

Batman is Just Not That Into You (2017)
Batman is Just Not That Into You is a short film included on the home media release of The Lego Batman Movie. Harley Quinn hosts a talk show and helps The Joker break up with Batman.

Cooking with Alfred (2017)
Cooking with Alfred is a short film included on the home media release of The Lego Batman Movie. Alfred hosts a cooking show with Batman and Robin as his guest stars.

Movie Sound Effects: How Do They Do That? (2017)
Movie Sound Effects: How Do They Do That? is a short film included on the home media release of The Lego Batman Movie. Bane, The Riddler, Poison Ivy and Catwoman are brought into a sound booth to help record sound effects for The Lego Batman Movie.

Shark E. Shark in "Which Way To The Ocean?" (2017)
Shark E. Shark in "Which Way To The Ocean?" is a short film included on the home media release of The Lego Ninjago Movie. The short follows a baby shark who tries to make its way back the ocean after getting shot out of Garmadon's Shark cannon. The short is animated in the style of the artwork seen in Lego instruction booklets.

Zane's Stand Up Promo (2017)
Zane's Stand Up Promo is a short film included on the home media release of The Lego Ninjago Movie. The short itself is a humorous promo for a Stand-up comedy DVD starring Zane.

Emmet's Holiday Party (2018)
On December 10, 2018, Warner Bros. released a Christmas-themed promotional short for The Lego Movie 2: The Second Part, titled Emmet's Holiday Party. In the short, Emmet and the citizens of Apocalypseburg throw a big Christmas Party to make everything awesome again despite the concern of attack from the Systar System from Lucy. Although originally released as an online short, it was eventually included as a bonus feature on The Lego Movie 2: The Second Parts home media release.

Cancelled shorts
Two additional shorts for theatrical distribution were in production alongside The Master in 2016: Contagious directed by Patrick Osbourne, and Emmet Amuck directed by Jon Saunders and Ross Evans. Both ultimately went unreleased.

Cast and characters

Additional crew and production details

Reception
Box office performance

Critical and public response

Accolades
Academy Awards

Golden Globe Awards

BAFTA Awards

Critic's Choice Awards

Annie Awards

Kids' Choice Awards

Visual Effects Society Awards

Producers Guild of America

In other media
Video games
The Lego Movie Videogame (2014)

The Lego Movie Videogame is the first video game in the franchise, and is loosely based on the 2014 film. The game was developed by TT Fusion, TT Games, and Feral Interactive (for macOS), and published by Warner Bros. Interactive Entertainment. It was released alongside the film in 2014 for PlayStation 4, Microsoft Windows, Nintendo 3DS, PlayStation 3,  PlayStation Vita, Wii U, Xbox 360, and Xbox One, and on 16 October 2014 for Mac OS X by Feral Interactive.

Todd Hanson is the only actor to reprise his role from the film as Gandalf, but Chris Pratt, Will Ferrell, Elizabeth Banks, Will Arnett, Nick Offerman, Alison Brie, Charlie Day, Liam Neeson and Morgan Freeman were credited for their film voices. It features over 100 playable characters.

Lego Dimensions (2015)

Lego Dimensions includes characters from various franchises, including The Lego Movie and The Lego Batman Movie. The game's Starter Pack includes Wyldstyle, while Emmet, Benny, Bad Cop, and Unikitty are included in Fun Packs. From The Lego Batman Movie, Robin and Batgirl are included in a Story Pack while Excalibur Batman is included in a Fun Pack.

The Lego Batman Movie Game (2017)
Based on The Lego Batman Movie, Warner Bros. Interactive Entertainment released the endless-runner game coinciding with the release of the film. It was released for Android and iOS.

The Lego Ninjago Movie Video Game (2017)

Based on The Lego Ninjago Movie, it was released for Microsoft Windows, Nintendo Switch, PlayStation 4, and Xbox One, alongside the film, in North America on 22 September 2017, and worldwide on 20 October 2017. It serves as the second spin-off video game and the third game in The Lego Movie franchise.

The Lego Movie 2 Videogame (2019)

Based on The Lego Movie 2: The Second Part, the next videogame in the series was announced on November 27, 2018, and was released in North America on February 26, 2019, for the PlayStation 4, Xbox One, Nintendo Switch and Microsoft Windows; on March 14, 2019, it was released on macOS.

Attractions

On December 16, 2015, a promo video for a new 4D film at Legoland Florida based on The Lego Movie called The Lego Movie: 4D – A New Adventure''''' was posted onto Lego's YouTube channel. The short subject premiered at Legoland Florida on January 29, 2016, before being rolled out to all other Legoland Parks and Legoland Discovery Centers later that year. It sees many of the original cast returning including Elizabeth Banks as Lucy "Wyldstyle", Nick Offerman as MetalBeard, Alison Brie as Princess Unikitty and Charlie Day as Benny while Emmet is voiced by A.J. Locascio (due to Chris Pratt being unavailable at the time). The ride introduces a new character, Risky Business (voiced by Patton Oswalt), who is Lord Business' older brother.

Lego sets

The Lego Movie Sets

The first sets were released in the United States on December 30, 2013, and in the United Kingdom on December 26 that based on the film The Lego Movie with 14 sets being released. The largest of the sets is "MetalBeard's Sea Cow" which included 2741 pieces and five minifigures. In addition to the sets three polybag sets have been released as promotions are "The Piece of Resistance", "Micro Manager Battle" and "Super Secret Police Enforcer".

The second sets were released in the United States on June 3, 2014, and in the United Kingdom on June 1 with 6 sets being released. In addition to the sets three polybag sets have been released as promotions are "Pyjamas Emmet", "Radio DJ Robot" and "Western Emmet".

The Lego Batman Movie Sets

The first sets were released in the United States on January 2, 2017, and in the United Kingdom on January 1 that based on the film The Lego Batman Movie with 13 sets being released. In addition to the sets 8 polybag sets have been released as promotions are "The Mini Batmobile", "Batman in the Phantom Zone", "The Joker Battle Training", "The Mini Batwing", "The Mini Ultimate Batmobile", "Disco Batman - Tears of Batman", "Batgirl" and "Bat Shooter".

The second sets were released in the United States on June 2, 2017, and in the United Kingdom on June 1 with 5 sets being released talso included "The Ultimate Batmobile". In addition to the sets 2 polybag sets have been released as promotions are "Batman Battle Pod" and "Accessory pack".	

The third sets were released in the United States on January 1, 2018, with 6 sets being released. The largest of the sets is "The Joker Manor" which included 3444 pieces and ten minifigures.

The Lego Ninjago Movie Sets

The first sets were released in the United States on August 1, 2017, that based on the film The Lego Ninjago Movie with 15 sets being released. The largest of the sets is "NINJAGO City" which included 4867 pieces and 19 minifigures.

The second sets were released in the United States on December 2, 2017, with 5 sets being released. In addition to the sets 5 polybag sets have been released as promotions are "Quake Mech", "Ice Tank", "Green Ninja Mech Dragon", "Kendo Lloyd" and "Lloyd".

The third sets were released in the United States on August 1, 2018, with only one set called "NINJAGO City Docks" which included 3553 pieces and 14 minifigures. In addition to the sets 2 polybag sets have been released as promotions are "Movie Maker" and "Kai's Dojo Pod" also included 1 magazine gift called "Lloyd".

The Lego Movie 2: The Second Part Sets

The first sets were released in the United States on January 5, 2019, and in the United Kingdom that based on the film The Lego Movie 2: The Second Part with 17 sets being released. The largest of the sets is "Rex's Rexplorer!" which included 1187 pieces and two minifigures. In addition to the sets five polybag sets have been released as promotions are "Emmet's 'Piece' Offering", "Rex's Plantimal Ambush", "Lucy vs. Alien Invader", "Mini Master-Building MetalBeard" and "Mini Master-Building Emmet".

The second sets were released in the United States on April 22, 2019, and in the United Kingdom on May 1 with 6 sets being released. The two largest sets are "The Rexcelsior!" and "Welcome to Apocalypseburg!". In addition to the sets two Magazine Gift sets have been released as promotions are "Emmet with Tools" and Rex with Jetpack".

Lego Unikitty! Sets

Notes

References

External links 
 
 Official Warner Bros. Site
 
 

The Lego Movie (franchise)
Warner Bros. Pictures franchises
Universal Pictures franchises
Toy franchises
Film franchises
Lego themes
Mass media franchises introduced in 2014
American children's animated adventure films
Comedy film franchises
Children's film series
Animated film series
Film series introduced in 2014